Lindy Marian Kasperski (October 29, 1950 – April 18, 2014) was a Canadian politician, who represented the constituency of Regina Sherwood in the Legislative Assembly of Saskatchewan from 1995 to 2003.

History

First elected in the 1995 election, Kasperski was a member of the Saskatchewan New Democratic Party caucus until 2001, when he was suspended from the caucus after being charged with criminal fraud. He was cleared of the charges in June 2003 and invited to rejoin the NDP caucus, but as he was facing a difficult nomination contest against four challengers in the redistricted constituency of Regina Walsh Acres, he opted not to rejoin the party. He ran as an independent candidate in the 2003 election, but lost to Sandra Morin.

He ran Kontakt Consulting, a media and communications consulting firm in Regina. He died suddenly on April 18, 2014.

References

1950 births
Saskatchewan New Democratic Party MLAs
Independent MLAs in Saskatchewan
Politicians from Regina, Saskatchewan
Canadian people of Polish descent
2014 deaths
21st-century Canadian politicians